Rail Bhawan is the headquarters of the Indian Railways. It is located at Raisina Road, New Delhi, near the Sansad Bhavan (Parliament House).

The office of Minister of Railways Shri Ashwini Vaishnaw and Minister of State, Railways Shri Suresh C. Angadi is in the Rail Bhavan, along with the Railway Board, comprising 7 members headed by Chairman Railway Board, Shri Suneet Sharma.

References

External links 
 Official website of the Ministry of Railways
 

Ministry of Railways (India)
Government buildings in Delhi
Year of establishment missing